This is a list of music awards and award nominations received by the English funk and acid jazz band Jamiroquai, When front-man Jay Kay signed with Sony Music, the band released Emergency on Planet Earth in 1993. The following year, the album was nominated for Best British Album at the Brit Awards and for the band Best British Breakthrough and Best British Group. The band received an additional 12 Brit Awards nominations during the course of their career. The group has won an Ivor Novello Award for Outstanding Song Collection from the British Academy of Songwriters, Composers, and Authors, as well as one Grammy Award, two MTV Video Music Awards,  with "Virtual Insanity", being named Video of the Year at the 1997 MTV Video Music Awards, and two Billboard Music Awards.

Awards and nominations
{| class="wikitable sortable plainrowheaders" 
|-
! scope="col" | Award
! scope="col" | Year
! scope="col" | Nominee(s)
! scope="col" | Category
! scope="col" | Result
! scope="col" class="unsortable"| 
|-
! scope="row" rowspan=3|Billboard Music Awards
|style="text-align:center;" rowspan="2" |1997
|rowspan="2"|"Virtual Insanity"
|Alternative/Modern Rock Clip of the Year
|
| rowspan="2" style="text-align:center;"|
|-
|Maximum Vision Award
|
|-
|style="text-align:center;"|2007
| "Runaway"
| Top Hot Dance Club Play Track
| 
|style="text-align:center;"|
|-
!scope="row" |BMI Awards
|style="text-align:center;"|2017
|Jay Kay
|BMI Presidents Award
|
|style="text-align:center;"|
|-
!scope="row" | Best Art Vinyl
|style="text-align:center;" | 2006
| "Space Cowboy"
| Best Vinyl Art
| 
|style="text-align:center;"|
|-
!scope="row" rowspan="15" |Brit Awards
|style="text-align:center;" rowspan="5" |1994
| rowspan="3" |Themselves
|Best British Breakthrough
|
|style="text-align:center;" rowspan="13" |
|-
|Best British Group
|
|-
|Best British Dance Act
|
|-
|Emergency on Planet Earth
|Best British Album
|
|-
| Too Young To Die 
|Best British Video
|
|-
|style="text-align:center;"|1995
|"Space Cowboy"
|Best British Video
|
|-
|style="text-align:center;" rowspan="2"|1997
|"Virtual Insanity"
|Best British Video
|
|-
|Travelling Without Moving
|Best Pop Album
|
|-
|style="text-align:center;" rowspan="2"|1998
|Themselves
|Best British Dance Act
|
|-
||"Alright"
|Best British Video
|
|-
|style="text-align:center;" rowspan="2"|1999
|"Deeper Underground"
|Best British Video
|
|-
|rowspan="4"|Themselves
|Best British Dance Act
|
|-
|style="text-align:center;"|2000
|Best British Dance Act
|
|-
|style="text-align:center;"|2002
|Best British Group
|
|style="text-align:center;|
|-
|style="text-align:center;"|2003
|Best British Dance Act
|
|style="text-align:center;" |
|-
!scope="row" rowspan="3" |Grammy Awards
| rowspan="2" style="text-align:center;"|1997
|"Virtual Insanity"
|Best Performance By A Duo Or Group
|
|style="text-align:center;" rowspan="3" |
|-
|Travelling Without Moving
|Best Pop Album
|
|-
|style="text-align:center;"|2005
|"Feels Just Like It Should"
|Best Short Form Music Video
|
|-
!scope="row" rowspan="5"|Hungarian Music Awards
|style="text-align:center;"|1998
|Travelling Without Moving
|Best Foreign Album
|
|style="text-align:center;"|
|-
|style="text-align:center;"|2000
|Synkronized
|Best Foreign Dance Album
|
| style="text-align:center;"|
|-
|style="text-align:center;"|2002
|A Funk Odyssey
|Best Foreign Dance Album
|
|style="text-align:center;"|
|-
|style="text-align:center;"|2011
|Rock Dust Light Star
|Modern Pop / Rock Album of the Year
|
|style="text-align:center;"| 
|-
|style="text-align:center;"|2018
|Automaton
|Pop / Rock Album of the Year
|
|style="text-align:center;"|
|-
!scope="row" rowspan=5|IFPI Platinum Europe Awards
|style="text-align:center;"|1996
| rowspan=2|Travelling Without Moving
| Award Level 1
| 
|style="text-align:center;"|
|-
|style="text-align:center;"|1997
| Award Level 2
| 
|style="text-align:center;"|
|-
| style="text-align:center;"|1999
| Synkronized
| Award Level 1
| 
|style="text-align:center;"|
|-
|style="text-align:center;"|2000
| Travelling Without Moving
| Award Level 3
| 
|style="text-align:center;"|
|-
|style="text-align:center;"|2001
| A Funk Odyssey
| Award Level 1
| 
|style="text-align:center;"|
|-
!scope="row"|International Dance Music Award
|style="text-align:center;"|2007
|"Runaway"
|Best Breaks / Electro Track
|
|style="text-align:center;"|
|-
!scope="row"|Ivor Novello Award
|style="text-align:center;"|1999
|Themselves
|Outstanding Song Collection
|
|style="text-align:center;"|
|-
!scope="row" rowspan="2"|Japan Gold Disc Awards
|style="text-align:center;"|1997
|Travelling Without Moving
|Best Album of the Year – Rock / Folk
|
|style="text-align:center;"|
|-
|style="text-align:center;"|2000
|Synkronized
|Rock Album of the Year
|
|style="text-align:center;"|
|-
!scope="row"|Kiss Awards
|style="text-align:center;"|2005
|Themselves
|Best Male Artist
|
|style="text-align:center;"|
|-
!scope="row" rowspan=2|MOBO Awards
|style="text-align:center;"|1997
|Travelling Without Moving
|Best Album
|
|style="text-align:center;"|
|-
|style="text-align:center;"|2005
| "Feels Just Like It Should"
| Best Video
| 
|style="text-align:center;"|
|-
!scope="row" rowspan="3"|MTV Europe Music Awards
|style="text-align:center;"|1996
|"Virtual Insanity"
|MTV Select
|
|style="text-align:center;" rowspan="3" |
|-
|rowspan="2" style="text-align:center;"|1999
|rowspan="2" |Themselves
|Best Group
|
|-
|Best Dance
|
|-
!scope="row" rowspan="5" |MTV Video Music Awards
|rowspan="5" style="text-align:center;"|1997
|Themselves
|Best New Artist
|
| rowspan="5" style="text-align:center;"|
|-
| rowspan="4" |"Virtual Insanity"
|Video of the Year
|
|-
|Breakthrough Video
|
|-
|Best Choreography
|
|-
|Viewers Choice
|
|-
!scope="row"|Silver Clef Award
|style="text-align:center;"|1998
|Themselves
|Silver Clef Award
|
|style="text-align:center;"|
|-
! scope="row" rowspan=10|Žebřík Music Awards
|style="text-align:center;" rowspan=5|1996
| rowspan=2|Themselves
| Best International Group
| 
| rowspan=5|
|-
| Best International Surprise
| 
|-
| Travelling Without Moving
| Best International Album
| 
|-
| "Cosmic Girl"
| Best International Song
| 
|-
| "Virtual Insanity"
| Best International Video
| 
|-
|style="text-align:center;" rowspan=3|1999
| Themselves
| Best International Group
| 
| rowspan=3|
|-
| Synkronized
| Best International Album
| 
|-
| "Canned Heat"
| Best International Song
| 
|-
|style="text-align:center;" |2005
| Jay Kay
| Best International Male
| 
| 
|-
|style="text-align:center;"| 2017
| "Automaton"
| Best International Video
| 
|

References 

Awards
Lists of awards received by British musician